Charles Chapman Pugh (born 1940) is an American mathematician who researches dynamical systems.
Pugh received his PhD under Philip Hartman of Johns Hopkins University in 1965, with the dissertation The Closing Lemma for Dimensions Two and Three. He has since been a professor, now emeritus, at the University of California, Berkeley.

In 1967 he published a closing lemma named after him in the theory of dynamical systems. The lemma states: Let f be a diffeomorphism of a compact manifold with a nonwandering point x. Then there is (in the space of diffeomorphisms, equipped with the  topology) in a neighborhood of f a diffeomorphism g for which x is a periodic point. That is, by a small perturbation of the original dynamical system, a system with periodic trajectory can be generated.

In 1970 he was an invited speaker at the International Congress of Mathematicians in Nice, delivering a talk on Invariant Manifolds.

Books
 Real Mathematical Analysis, Springer-Verlag, 2002

Notes

21st-century American mathematicians
20th-century American mathematicians
University of California, Berkeley faculty
1940 births
Living people
Johns Hopkins University alumni